Orenda  is the Haudenosaunee name for a certain spiritual energy inherent in people and their environment. It is an "extraordinary invisible power believed by the Iroquois Native Americans to pervade in varying degrees in all animate and inanimate natural objects as a transmissible spiritual energy capable of being exerted according to the will of its possessor." Orenda is a collective power of nature's energies through the living energy of all natural objects: animate and inanimate. 

Anthropologist J. N. B. Hewitt notes intrinsic similarities between the Haudenosaunee concept of Orenda and that of the Siouxan wakan or mahopa; the Algonquin manitowi, and the pokunt of the Shoshone. Across the Iroquois tribes, the concept was referred to variously as orenna or karenna by the Mohawk, Cayuga, and Oneida; urente by the Tuscarora, and iarenda or orenda by the Huron.

Orenda is present in nature: storms are said to possess orenda. A strong connection exists between prayers and songs and orenda. Through song, a bird, a shaman, or a rabbit puts forth orenda.

See also
Manitou, similar concept among Algonquian peoples
Mana
Indigenous American philosophy
Ecopsychology
Spiritual ecology

Footnotes

References

 
Energy (esotericism)
Vitalism
Iroquois culture
Anthropology of religion
Spiritualism